The Maputaland-Pondoland bushland and thickets is one of the ecoregions of South Africa. It consists of the montane shrubland biome.

Geography
It is bounded on the east by the KwaZulu-Cape coastal forest mosaic, which lies in the humid coastal strip along the Indian Ocean; to the west it is bounded by the higher-elevation Drakensberg montane grasslands, woodlands and forests. To the south, it transitions to the drier Albany thickets, which are characterized by more succulent and spiny plants.

Climate
The ecoregion has a dry subtropical climate. Rainfall varies from 800 mm to 450 mm per year, with approximately three-quarters of the rain falling in the warm summer months between October and March. Frosts are rare because of the moderating influence of the Indian Ocean.

Flora

The typical vegetation is sclerophyll evergreen shrubs, which form dense, closed canopy thickets up to six meters in height. The ecoregion, which is in a transition between moist and dry, montane and lowland, and temperate and tropical, has a rich diversity of species, although with few endemics.

Fauna
The ecoregion is home to a variety of animal species, including endangered black rhinos (Diceros bicornis) and white rhinos (Ceratotherium simum).

Protected areas
A 1994 survey found that about 7.5% of the ecoregion is in protected areas. Protected areas include the Great Fish River Nature Reserve, Oribi Gorge Nature Reserve, and Thomas Baines Nature Reserve.

See also

References

External links

Maputaland-Pondoland-Albany

Afromontane ecoregions
Afrotropical ecoregions
Drakensberg
Ecoregions of South Africa
Grasslands of South Africa
Montane grasslands and shrublands